Zotter Schokoladen Manufaktur manufactures chocolates, and was founded in 1999 by Josef Zotter. Its headquarters is in Bergl near Riegersburg, a municipality in the  Südoststeiermark in the Austrian state of Styria. Annually, around 300 tonnes of cocoa beans and 150 tonnes of cocoa butter are turned into 600 tonnes of chocolate, served in the form of more than 400 varieties of chocolate, pralines, drinking chocolate and other types of chocolate.

Zotter is a bean-to-bar chocolate manufacturer, carrying out the entire chocolate production process on site: from roasting cocoa beans on rollers to grinding in the conche.

History 
In 1987 Josef Zotter and his wife Ulrike opened the Zotter Konditorei confectionery in Graz, southern Austria. Zotter's created confectioneries like the “Hemp Bar” and the “Funny Cake”. He expanded, opening three more branches.

Zotter began to produce chocolate in a back room of their confectionery in 1992. He created hand-scooped chocolate with layered centers and a new 70-gram bar without the customary cubic break-off shape. Amongst others the first range of flavors included pumpkin, marzipan and dried fruit.

Two years later art designer Andreas H. Gratze designed artful wrappings and named the chocolate bars.

In 1996, Zotter went into administration and closed three branches.

In 1998, a new product range of drinking chocolates was introduced in the shape of hand-scooped chocolate bars.

After that Zotter decided to only produce chocolate and opened the Zotter Chocolate Manufactory in 1999. Demand for Zotter's chocolate increased and the factory was expanded.

The manufactory was converted into a bean-to-bar production house by Josef Zotter in 2007. He also launched the Chocolate Theatre where visitors can experience chocolate production from beginning to end. The first  chocolate bar created at his bean-to-bar factory was a pure chocolate bar called Labooko.

In 2011, the Edible Zoo, a farm which is an open air section of the Chocolate Theatre, was opened.

In 2015, Zotter ranked among the world's best 25 chocolate producers from 70 countries. In 2016 two gold, eight silver and five bronze medals were awarded to Zotter chocolates.

Philosophy 
The chocolate factory produces 365 different chocolates with individual tastes. Its production is in-house and it does bean-to-bar chocolate production.
There are many varieties like cheese chocolate, fish chocolate and wine chocolate. The chocolate wrappings were created by Andreas H. Gratze. All Zotter products claim to be "organic and fair-trade", in the belief that quality begins with the ingredients, so they claim to "work together with small farmers and invite them to the factory".

Brands and products 
 Hand-scooped: chocolate bars filled with different ingredients
 Labooko: origin chocolates from different places in the world
 Mitzi Blue: a round chocolate with breaking patterns
 Customized Choco: individual chocolate with different shapes and flavors
 Nougsus Nougat: nougat bar, such as peanut or cashew nougat
 Whole Nuts: chocolate with whole nuts, fruits and raisins mixed in
 Nashis-Mini: a chocolate variety of mini chocolates
 Nashido: thin mini chocolate bars with a creamy filling in ten different flavors
 Drinking Chocolate: different variations of drinking chocolates which can be melted in hot milk
 Balleros: dried fruit and roasted nut pieces rolled in chocolate
 Biofekt-Pralinies: filled and hand-decorated pralines
 BASiC Couverture and Light Bulbs: for baking, mixing creams or mousses
 Sim Bim Cakes: cakes in a glass
 Coffee Mi(s)Chung: coffee beans from Mexican, Colombian and Indian cocoa farmers which are roasted in-house at the factory
 Pop Art Corn: popcorn coated with chocolate
 CREMA Nougat: nougat cream in a glass
 Globally: small chocolate balls
 Flic Flocs: chocolate flakes in eight varieties
 Nutting Hills: nougat bar with whole nuts inside
 ChocoShots: Zotter fillings in a syringe
 Lollytop: chocolate lolly pops, which are available in different colors
 Stack of Leaves: very thin chocolate bars
 Nibs+CocoaBeans: cocoa beans for snacking

See also

 List of bean-to-bar chocolate manufacturers

References

External links
 Zotter Schokoladen Manufaktur Official Website

Food and drink companies established in 1999
Austrian brands
Chocolate companies
Food and drink companies of Austria
Manufacturing companies of Austria
Economy of Styria
Austrian companies established in 1999
dei beidl falt